Mehdi Fetallah Benchikhoune (born April 3, 1996 in Azazga) is an Algerian footballer who plays for Algerian Ligue 2 club WA Boufarik.

In July 2017, Benchikhoune was promoted to USM Alger's senior team.

References

External links
 

1996 births
Algerian footballers
Algerian Ligue Professionnelle 1 players
Kabyle people
Living people
MC Alger players
People from Azazga
USM Alger players
Algeria youth international footballers
Association football midfielders
21st-century Algerian people